Viruet is a surname. Notable people with the surname include:

Adolfo Viruet (born 1952), Puerto Rican boxer
Edwin Viruet (born 1950), Puerto Rican boxer